Songs About Time is a multimedia project released by The Rentals throughout 2009.  It consists of Songs About Time, three mini-albums released every three months; Films About Weeks, 52 black and white short films scored and arranged by The Rentals and released every Tuesday; and Photographs About Days, 365 photographs released daily.  The first of the mini albums, Chapter One, was released April 7, 2009; Chapter Two was released July 7, 2009 and Chapter Three was released on October 20, 2009.  All three chapters were released digitally via therentals.com.  The first chapter, entitled The Story of a Thousand Seasons Past, was recorded during late 2008 and early 2009.  It features guest playing from Joey Santiago (of The Pixies).

Track listing

Chapter Four: Tokyo Blues

Resilience: A Benefit Album for the Relief Effort in Japan

In 2011, Tokyo Blues, the fourth album from Songs About Time, was re-released as Resilience: A Benefit Album for the Relief Effort in Japan as a fundraising effort for the 2011 Japanese disasters.

References

2009 EPs
The Rentals albums
EP series